Muhammad Ibrahim Joyo (
13 August 1915 – 9 November 2017) was a Pakistani teacher, writer, scholar and Sindhi nationalist. He was born in the village of Abad near Laki, Kotri, Dadu, now in Jamshoro, Sindh, Pakistan. He was considered the living legend of Sindhi literature, who had written, translated and edited hundreds of books and brochures. He was affiliated with the Theosophical Society.

On Thursday, 13 August 2015, Joyo entered centennial of his life.

Joyo received his early education from local village. He got education from Luki and Sann. He then passed his matriculation from Sindh Madarsatul Islam in 1934. In 1938, Joyo passed B.A. from DG Sindh College; University of Bombay. He went to Bombay for TP education.

Career
Muhammad Ibrahim Joyo was appointed a teacher in Sindh Madrasatul Islam in 1941. He wrote a book entitled Save Sindh, Save the Continent. This work angered the administration authorities, causing a conflict with Pir Ilahi Bux who ordered Joyo's removal from his job. However, he got a new job in Thatta Municipal High School.

Later on, he was transferred to Hyderabad at training college. He was appointed secretary of Sindhi Adabi Board in 1951. In 1961, Joyo retired from his job. Again, he was offered the same job a number of times. He was secretary of Sindhi Adabi Board till 1973. He was also involved with Sindh Textbook Board and served as chairman of the Sindhi Adabi Board.

Joyo has translated and written a number of books. He had many translations of famous European books to his credit. He has been writing on Sindh and Sindhi for 70 years.

In 2013, he received a literary award from the Pakistan Academy of Letters. and also honorary degrees from the renowned universities.

He had written many story books and text books for school children, prefaces, debates and a lot of essays.

Joyo was well-learned about History of Intellectual Development of Europe by J W Draper. He also read diverse writers such as Plutarch, Rousseau, Chekhov and Brecht.

Death
Muhammad Ibrahim Joyo died at the age of 102 at his elder son's residence in Hyderabad, Sindh, Pakistan on 9 November 2017.

Sources

 Maro jee Malir Ja by Khadim Hussain Chandio

See also

 Nabi Bux Khan Baloch
 Dr. Umar Bin Muhammad Daudpota
 Hassam-ud-Din Rashidi
 Mirza Qalich Baig
 Allama I. I. Kazi
 Elsa Kazi
 Muhammad Ali Siddiqui
 Ali Muhammad Rashidi
 GM Syed
 Abdul Wahid Aresar

1915 births
2017 deaths
Sindhi people
Men centenarians
Pakistani centenarians
Pakistani philosophers
Pakistani schoolteachers
Pakistani Theosophists
Pakistani translators
Pakistani writers
Sindhi-language writers
Sindh Madressatul Islam University alumni
University of Mumbai alumni
People from Jamshoro District